Joy Wendy Beasley (born 25 July 1962) is a British former swimmer. She competed at the 1976 Summer Olympics and the 1980 Summer Olympics.

She also represented England in the 100 and 200 metres backstroke, at the 1978 Commonwealth Games in Edmonton, Alberta, Canada. In 1977 she won the ASA National Championship over 100 metres backstroke.

References

External links
 

1962 births
Living people
British female swimmers
Olympic swimmers of Great Britain
Swimmers at the 1976 Summer Olympics
Swimmers at the 1980 Summer Olympics
Swimmers at the 1978 Commonwealth Games
Sportspeople from Stourbridge
Commonwealth Games competitors for England
20th-century British women